Neues vom Süderhof (lit. "News from the Suderhof") is a German children's television series. The heart of the series are the five Brendel children who live on the Süderhof farm. Dr. Günther Brendel is a veterinarian and his wife Sonia is an author writing a book about parenting. They live with their two daughters, Bimbo and Molle, and next-door live Grandma and Grandpa Brendel. After Günther's brother and sister-in-law are killed in a plane crash, Sonia and Günther adopt their children, Dany, Peggy, and Benny. Thus, the series chronicles the experiences of these five children and their lives on the Süderhof farm.

The series was very popular with children and early youths in Germany and was re-aired multiple times. Many episodes were also shown on the popular children's entertainment show Tigerenten Club.

Production 

Neues vom Süderhof (Neues vom Süderhof) was written by Marlies Kerremans, and is based on the novels by Hamburg author Brigitte Blobel. This ARD and Norddeutscher Rundfunk (NDR) TV show ran from 1991 to 1997 and had 52 episodes.

The series was originally produced and broadcast by ARD as a 13-episode series in 1991. "Süderhof I" refers to the 13 episodes in the 1991–92 season. After ARD lost the broadcasting rights to Süderhof I, no new episodes were produced. After a break of several years, NDR produced a reboot in 1995. "Süderhof II" refers to the 39 episodes of 1995–1997. Because Brigitte Blobel specified that the children do not age in the books, almost the entire team of actors was recast. Additionally, the spirit of the TV series changed greatly from Suderhof I to Suderhof II.

The main filming locations were a horse farm in Handeloh with many outdoor scenes in the area, the city center of Buchholz (Nordheide) and the Gymnasium in Trittau, but also numerous other places in the southern and eastern parts of Hamburg. Monika Zinnenberg directed all the episodes, and the screenplay was written by Marlies Kerremans based on the literary sources of Brigitte Blobel. The theme music was composed by Rolf Zuckowski, and the background music came from Süderhof I by Michael Reinecke, who provided the German contributions to the Euro Vision Song Contest in 1983 and 1984.

The opening theme song was written and composed by Rolf Zuckowski. "Wir sind die Kinder vom Süderhof" (lit. "We are the children of the Suderhof") has become a very popular standalone song in German culture.

Characters 

Günter Brendel is a veterinarian on the Süderhof farm, and his wife Sonia is writing a book about parenting. Bimbo and Molle are Günter and Sonja Brendel's children. In the opening episode, Günter's brother, Tom, and his wife, Francis, were killed in a plane crash. Their three orphaned children, Dany, Peggy, and Benny, are then adopted into the Brendel family.

It is common for the Brendel children to meet neighboring children, both on the farm and at school. These children include Bastian Broders, Henner, and Tom. The children are taught by a variety of teachers, including the English teacher Dolores "Dolly" Malzahn, Dr. Theiss, and Dr. Funke. Dr. Brendel employs an assistant vet named Christine. They also meet other adults around town, including Mayor Feddersen, Jo, and Bob Anderson.

The themes of the show center on the struggles of day-to-day living on a farm in a small town, financial and social struggles, and familial relationships. The Brendel children deal with the grief over the passing of loved ones and pets and academic struggles. The Brendel adults deal with the monetary and financial struggles of running a farm and raising a family, as well as the death and the grieving process. A common theme is that they find that the animals and their companionship, as well as the support of family and friends, can mitigate their problems.

Süderhof I (1991–1993)

Actors 
The first six episodes of Süderhof were shot in mid-1991. They aired in late 1991 and early 1992, as the leading program of the ARD broadcasting channel.

In mid-1992, another 6 episodes were shot (episodes 7–12). All of these episodes premiered in mid- to late 1993. Afterwards, there were broadcast in almost continuous repetition in all ARD-programs, as well as on 3sat and ORF.

These actors starred in the leading roles in the first 13 episodes:

Episodes (Season 1)

Episodes (Season 2)

Süderhof II (1995–1997) 

ARD eventually lost the rights to the Süderhof show, and production on episodes stopped. After a long break of four years, a different broadcasting company, Norddeutscher Rundfunk, produced more seasons of the series. However, even though the actors in the original Süderhof series were only four years older, they were said to have outgrown the roles because the children in the books never aged.

A completely new cast was chosen. All new actors were chosen, except for Ursula Hinrichs (grandmother Brendel), and some supporting cast members. The new actors were changed with no regard for the looks of the previous.

In 1995, the next season with 13 episodes was shot, which were broadcast in the first half of 1996 in Tigerenten Club. They're were 13 episodes in 1997, season 6, the last season of Neues vom Suderhof.

In the special episode "Visiting the Süderhof", which also aired for the first time in the "Tigerenten Club", the performers of the first two seasons handed over their roles to the new cast members.

The most well-known actress of these later episodes was Sabine Kaack, as mother Sonia Brendel. Before that, she had also starred in the series "Brief secrecy" (ZDF), also directed by Monika Zinnenberg. In the case of the grandparents, the first names were changed by mistake, but it was completely irrelevant to the plot.

Actors 
The main roles were filled as follows:

The penultimate season with another 13 episodes (episodes 27–39 in the total, 14-26 for Süderhof II) followed in mid-1996, first broadcast was in early 1997. Ilse Werner is seen in a guest role.

The final season of the series was filmed in 1997, and premiered in the first half of 1998. This season, Bimbo was replaced by a new protagonist named Lili, played by Ann-Kristin Schmeisser. In the fourth episode ("Dany and the dear money") it was announced that Bimbo is in America.

Episodes (Season 3)

Episodes (Season 4)

Radio play 
Neues vom Süderhof was adapted into a radio play. The episodes of the audio play were based on the first 13 TV episodes of Süderhof I.
 The radio play version of News from the Suderhof ranked 12th place in the Children's Bestsellers list in 1998.

CD-Rom 

In 1998, there was also a CD-ROM version of Neues vom Süderhof that could run on Windows 95 or 3.1. This game was in the genre of "edutainment," combining both videos of the TV show, behind-the-scenes clips, as well as information on animals, plants, endangered animals, and how to find more information on animal conservation and environmental protection.

References

External links
 

 
German children's television series
1991 German television series debuts
1998 German television series endings
German-language television shows
Das Erste original programming